EMIS or EMiS can mean:

 Education management information system - a management information system for the education sector
 EMIS Health - a software company serving medical practices in Great Britain
 Empresa Interbancária de Serviços - Interbank network for all electronic payments in Angola
 Environmental management information system - an information technology system used for tracking environmental data for a company
 Emergency management information system - a computer database for disaster response
 European Movement in Scotland - a non-party-polical pressure group campaigning for closer association with the European Union